The Tokinominoru Kinen (Japanese 共同通信杯) is a Grade 3 horse race for three-year-old Thoroughbreds run in February over a distance of 1800 metres at Tokyo Racecourse. Officially known as the Kyodo News Hai, the race is named in honour of the undefeated racehorse Tokino Minoru.

The race was first run in 1967 and was elevated to Grade 3 status in 1984. It was contested at variety of venues but has been run over its current course and distance since 1980. The race serves as a trial race for the Satsuki Sho. Winners of the race have included Mr C B, Narita Brian, El Condor Pasa, Jungle Pocket, Admire Moon and Gold Ship.

Winners since 2000  

 The 2003 running took place at Nakayama Racecourse.

Earlier winners

 1984 - Bizen Nikishi
 1985 - Sakura Yutaka O
 1986 - Dyna Gulliver
 1987 - Meiner David
 1988 - Muguet Royal
 1989 - Meiner Brave
 1990 - Ines Fujin
 1991 - Iide Saison
 1992 - Air Jordan
 1993 - Meiner Remark
 1994 - Narita Brian
 1995 - Narita King O
 1996 - Sakura Speed O
 1997 - Mejiro Bright
 1998 - El Condor Pasa
 1999 - Yamanin Acro

See also
 Horse racing in Japan
 List of Japanese flat horse races

References

Turf races in Japan